Fabien Barel (born 26 July 1980) is a French former professional downhill mountain biker. He won three world downhill titles during his career. He announced his retirement from downhill in 2011, and now competes in enduro races. In 2013, he signed with the new Canyon Bicycles Factory Enduro Team.

References

1980 births
Living people
UCI Mountain Bike World Champions (men)
French male cyclists
Downhill mountain bikers
Cyclists from Nice
French mountain bikers